The Dream of the Red Chamber Award: The World's Distinguished Novel in Chinese (紅樓夢獎：世界華文長篇小說獎) is a biennial novel prize presented by Hong Kong Baptist University recognizing Chinese language fiction published both within China, and also internationally. Although the prize is named after the famous Qing novel Dream of the Red Chamber, works do not need to have any relationship to that novel.

Winners and nominees

References

Official Site in English

Awards established in 2006
2006 establishments in Hong Kong
Chinese-language literary awards